"The Second Man" was an American television play broadcast live on February 12, 1959 as the 100th episode of the CBS television series, Playhouse 90.  The cast was led by James Mason. The teleplay was written by Leslie Stevens as an adaptation of the novel, The Second Man, by Edward Grierson.

Plot
A woman barrister at a prestigious London chambers tries to save a young man accused of murdering his wealthy aunt.

Cast
The cast included the following:

 James Mason - Hesketh
 Margaret Leighton - Miss Kerrison
 Hugh Griffith - Jaggers
 Diana Wynyard - Jane Birman
 Kenneth Haigh - Maudsley

Production
The program was presented live from Television city in Hollywood on February 19, 1959, on the CBS television series Playhouse 90. The teleplay was written by Leslie Stevens as an adaptation of the novel, The Second Man (1956), by Edward Grierson.

Reception
Television critic William Ewald of the UPI wrote: "The play was the sort of thing I believe Britons refer to as jolly good theater. It is dead-end theater -- predictable, fully charted, bounded by convention -- but even so, it is a joy to watch when it's parceled attractively. . . . The players bit into this chunk with enormous relish and I must say I enjoyed every minute of it."

References

1959 American television episodes
Playhouse 90 (season 3) episodes
1959 television plays